The Fujinon XF 16mm F1.4 R WR is an interchangeable camera lens announced by Fujifilm on April 16, 2015. It has an unusually wide maximum aperture given its focal length, and is weather-sealed.

References

16
Camera lenses introduced in 2015